Changsha Normal University is a public teachers college in Changsha, Hunan, China.

As of fall 2013, the university has two campuses, a combined student body of 10,000 students, 600 faculty members.

The university consists of 10 departments, with 6 specialties for undergraduates. The university covers a total area of 1,100 mu, with more than 10,178 square meters of floor space. 

As of 2021, the Best Chinese Universities Ranking, also known as the "Shanghai Ranking", placed the university 554th in China.

History
Changsha Normal University was founded in 1912 by Xu Teli, it was initially called "Changsha County Normal School".

In April 2013, the institute was granted the college status and was approved by the Ministry of Education to use "Changsha Teachers College" as its Chinese name. However, since the Ministry does not regulate academic institutions' English names, the institute used "Changsha Normal University" as its English name since then despite the fact that it was not granted the university status.

Academics
 Department of Preprimary Education
 Department of Elementary Education 
 Department of Music
 Department of Foreign Languages  
 Department of Animation
 Department of Electronic and Information Engineering
 Department of Digital Publishing 
 Department of Art and Design
 Department of Economic Management
 Department of Physical Education

Affiliated schools
 No.1 Attached Kindergarten
 No.2 Attached Kindergarten

People

Notable alumni
 Tian Han
 Xu Guangda
 Liao Mosha
 Liu Ying
 Xie Bingying
 Luo Xuezan

Notable faculty
 Xu Teli
 Yang Changji
 Zhu Jianfan
 Zhou Gucheng
 Liu Zhixun

References

External links

Universities and colleges in Hunan
Teachers colleges in China
Educational institutions established in 1912
Education in Changsha
1912 establishments in China
Universities and colleges in Changsha